Henry Augustus Muhlenberg (July 21, 1823 – January 9, 1854) was an American politician and Congressman (Democratic) representing the state of Pennsylvania.

Early years
Muhlenberg was a member of the Muhlenberg Family political dynasty. He was born in Reading, Pennsylvania, on July 21, 1823. His father, Henry A. P. Muhlenberg, was a Congressman and U.S. Minister to Austria; his grandfather, Joseph Hiester, was the governor of Pennsylvania.

Career
Muhlenberg attended Dickinson College in Carlisle, Pennsylvania. He studied law and was admitted to the bar in 1844, practicing law in Reading, Pennsylvania. He was elected to the Pennsylvania State Senate in 1849, serving until 1852 when he was elected to the United States House of Representatives to represent the 8th Congressional district.  He began Congressional service on March 4, 1853, and died less than a year later.

Death
Muhlenberg died in Washington, D.C., on January 9, 1854, while in office. He was buried in the Charles Evans Cemetery in Reading.

His son, Henry Augustus Muhlenberg, III ran for Congress in 1892, unsuccessfully.

See also
List of United States Congress members who died in office (1790–1899)

References

The Political Graveyard

1823 births
1854 deaths
Burials at Charles Evans Cemetery
Dickinson College alumni
Democratic Party Pennsylvania state senators
Pennsylvania lawyers
Politicians from Reading, Pennsylvania
Hiester family
Muhlenberg family
Democratic Party members of the United States House of Representatives from Pennsylvania
19th-century American politicians
19th-century American lawyers